The Cinematography Mailing List is a website and collection of mailing lists founded by Geoff Boyle in November 1996. The CML is run on a volunteer basis by professional cinematographers "to promote the free exchange of ideas among fellow professionals, the cinematographer, their camera crew, manufacturers, rental houses and related businesses."

The Cinematography Mailing List maintains 12 separate mailing lists covering a variety of cinematography related topics, including lists for general cinematography, UHD & HDR cinematography, lighting, post-production, documentary work, etc. Membership for the lists is free for cinematographers and related industry professionals. A separate mailing list is available for film students (CML-mentor).

The CML website holds an archive of all past discussions which is available only to registered members. A book version of the archive titled 'CML - The First Five Years' which includes all the discussions on the CML from 1997 to 2001, was released in 2005 and is used as a cinematography reference much like 'the ASC Manual' or David Samuelson's 'Hands-On Manual for Cinematographers'. This was followed with collections on Lighting, RED and UHD.

The CML has over 12,600 members worldwide, including members of the American Society of Cinematographers, the British Society of Cinematographers, the Canadian Society of Cinematographers, etc. as well as representatives from most major equipment manufacturers. The volunteer cinematographers who oversee the mailing lists are called "listmums" instead of moderators.

CML now has a subsidiary list cmltests.net that specializes in the testing of cameras and lenses in an open and easily repeatable way.

The RAW files from these tests are available for download so everyone is able to make their own assessments

The discussion section of CML was moved to https://cml.news in 2017 in order to utilize new technologies more effectively

In 2000, Geoff Boyle was presented an award by the Society of Motion Picture and Television Engineers for "his contributions to communication and education among cinematographers, through the Cinematography Mailing List (CML), which he founded." 

In 2006, Geoff Boyle was awarded the British Society of Cinematographers Bert Easy Technical Award for his work with CML.

Geoff Boyle died on October 5, 2021, from cancer.

BKSTS (British Kinematograph, Sound & Television Society) appointed Fellow

ACS (Australian Cinematographers Society) honorary member

NSC (Netherlands Society of Cinematographers) full member

References

External links
CML website
The Eastman Kodak Gold Medal Award History

Cinematography organizations